Florin Laurențiu Tudor (born 17 June 1976) is a Romanian professional football manager and former footballer.

References

1976 births
Living people
Footballers from Bucharest
Romanian footballers
Association football defenders
Romanian football managers
Flota Świnoujście managers
CS Sportul Snagov managers
Romanian expatriate sportspeople in Moldova
Romanian expatriate sportspeople in Poland